Minister of Science and Technological Development was the person in charge of the Ministry of Science and Technological Development of Montenegro (Ministarstvo nauke i tehnološkog razvoja). Prior to 2010, the Minister of Education and Science was in charge of science affairs. In 2020, Ministry once again merged into the Ministry of Education. It was once again re-established in 2022 as Ministry of Science and Technological Development.

Ministers of Science (2010-2020)

References

Government ministries of Montenegro
Ministries established in 2010
2010 establishments in Montenegro
Science and technology ministries